The Henry T. Rainey Farm is a historic farm located on the north side of Illinois Route 108 in Greene County, Illinois, east of Carrollton. The main farmhouse, known as Walnut Hall, was built in 1868-70 by settler Luman Curtius. The red brick house features Greek Revival and Italianate influences. Politician Henry Thomas Rainey bought the farm in 1909. Rainey served in the U.S. House of Representatives from 1903 to 1921, and again from 1923 to his death in 1934; during his last two years in office, he was Speaker of the House. As Speaker of the House, Rainey presided over the passage of New Deal legislation during President Franklin D. Roosevelt's Hundred Days; as a representative, he promoted causes such as environmental conservation and agricultural aid programs.

The farm was added to the National Register of Historic Places on May 12, 1987.

Notes

Buildings and structures in Greene County, Illinois
National Register of Historic Places in Greene County, Illinois
Farms on the National Register of Historic Places in Illinois